Sailors Have No Questions is a 1980 Soviet comedy film directed by Vladimir Rogovoy.

Plot 
In the center of the plot is Alka Shanina, who is going to enter the theater institute, and the sailor Sanya Fokin, who goes to his native village for a wedding. They meet on the plane, which made an emergency landing due to bad weather, as a result of which they spent three days together.

Cast 
 Natalya Kaznacheyeva as Alka
 Vadim Andreev as Aleksandr Ivanovich
 Tatyana Pelttser as Klavdiya Mikhajlovna
 Mikhail Pugovkin as Uncle Misha
 Nikolai Denisov
 Lyudmila Khityaeva		
 Vadim Zakharchenko
 Yuriy Sarantsev
 Yevgeniya Khanayeva
 Georgiy Yumatov

References

External links 
 

1980 films
1980s Russian-language films
Soviet comedy films
Films directed by Vladimir Rogovoy
1980 comedy films
Soviet teen films